A Borromean nucleus is an atomic nucleus comprising three bound components in which any subsystem of two components is unbound. This has the consequence that if one component is removed, the remaining two comprise an unbound resonance, so that the original nucleus is split into three parts.

The name is derived from the Borromean rings, a system of three linked rings in which no pair of rings is linked.

Examples of Borromean nuclei
Many Borromean nuclei are light nuclei near the nuclear drip lines that have a nuclear halo and low nuclear binding energy. These are Borromean nuclei because the removal of either neutron from the halo will result in a resonance unbound to one-neutron emission, whereas the dineutron (the particles in the halo) is itself an unbound system.

Namely, these are three-body systems whose unbound components (formed from ) are intermediate steps in the triple-alpha process; this limits the rate of production of heavier elements, for three bodies must react nearly simultaneously. 

Borromean nuclei consisting of more than three components can also exist. These also lie along the drip lines; for instance,  is a five-body Borromean system with a four-neutron halo.

Heavier species along the neutron drip line have since been observed; these and undiscovered heavier nuclei along the drip line are also likely to be Borromean nuclei with varying numbers (3, 5, 7, or more) of bodies.

See also 

 Efimov state
 Three-body force
 Halo nucleus

References

Nuclear physics